Below is a list of various national ice hockey team rosters of the United States of America. The men's teams, the women's teams and the junior teams are included.

Men's Olympics

1920 Summer Olympics 
(won silver medal)
Head Coach: Cornelius Fellowes

1924 Winter Olympics 
(won silver medal)

1928 Winter Olympics 

Did not participate

1932 Winter Olympics 

(won silver medal)

1936 Winter Olympics 

(won bronze medal)

1948 Winter Olympics 

(4th, disqualified)

1952 Winter Olympics 

(won silver medal)

1956 Winter Olympics 

(won silver medal)

1960 Winter Olympics 

(won gold medal)

1964 Winter Olympics 

(finished 5th)

1968 Winter Olympics 

(finished 6th)

1972 Winter Olympics 

(won silver medal)

1976 Winter Olympics 

(finished 5th)

1980 Winter Olympics 

(won gold medal)
Head Coach: Herb Brooks

1984 Winter Olympics 

(finished 7th)

1988 Winter Olympics 

(finished 7th)

1992 Winter Olympics 

(finished 4th)

1994 Winter Olympics 

(finished 8th)

1998 Winter Olympics 

(finished 6th)

† Langenbrunner was a last-minute replacement for McEachern who had back problems

2002 Winter Olympics 

(won silver medal)
Head Coach: Herb Brooks

2006 Winter Olympics 
(finished 8th)

2010 Winter Olympics 

 won silver medal

2014 Winter Olympics 
 finished 4th

2018 Winter Olympics 

 finished 7th

IIHF World Championships

1998 IIHF World Championship 

(finished 12th)

1999 IIHF World Championship 

(finished 6th)

2000 IIHF World Championship 

(finished 5th)

2001 IIHF World Championship 

(finished 4th)

2002 IIHF World Championship 

(finished 7th)

2003 IIHF World Championship 

(finished 13th)

2004 IIHF World Championship 

(won bronze medal)

† Listed at Forward

2005 IIHF World Championship 

(finished 6th)

The NHL season was canceled due to the 2004–05 NHL lockout listed below are the teams players were playing for (if any) during the labor dispute and the franchises they returned to.

2006 IIHF World Championship 

(finished 7th)

2007 IIHF World Championship 

(finished 5th)

2008 IIHF World Championship 

(finished 6th)

2009 IIHF World Championship 

(finished 4th)

2010 IIHF World Championship 

 Finished 13th

2011 IIHF World Championship 
 Finished 8th

2012 IIHF World Championship 
 Finished 7th

2013 IIHF World Championship 
 Won bronze medal

2014 IIHF World Championship 
 Finished 6th

2015 IIHF World Championship 
 Won bronze medal

2016 IIHF World Championship 
 Finished 4th

2017 IIHF World Championship
 Finished 5th

2018 IIHF World Championship
 Won bronze medal

2019 IIHF World Championship
 Finished 7th

World Cup of Hockey

1996 World Cup of Hockey 
(Won Inaugural Tournament)

2004 World Cup of Hockey 
(finished 4th)

2016 World Cup of Hockey 
 Finished 7th

Canada Cup

1976 Canada Cup 

(finished 5th)

1981 Canada Cup 

(finished 4th)

1984 Canada Cup 

(finished 4th)

1987 Canada Cup 

(finished 5th)

1991 Canada Cup 

(finished 2nd)

Women's

Men's U20

1999 World Junior 

(finished 8th)

2000 World Junior 

(finished 4th)

2001 World Junior 

(finished 5th)

2002 World Junior 
(finished 5th)

2003 World Junior 

(finished 4th)

2004 World Junior 

(won gold medal)

2005 World Juniors 

(finished 4th)

2006 World Juniors 

(finished 4th)

2007 World Juniors 

(won bronze medal)

2008 World Juniors 

(finished 4th)

2009 World Juniors 
(finished 5th)

2010 World Juniors 
Won gold medal.

2011 World Juniors 
Won Bronze medal

2012 World Juniors 
Finished 7th

2013 World Juniors 
won gold medal

2014 World Juniors 
Finished 5th

2015 World Juniors 
Finished 5th

2016 World Juniors 
Won bronze medal

2017 World Juniors 
 Won gold medal

2018 World Juniors 
 Won bronze medal

2019 World Juniors 
 Won silver medal

See also 

 Ice hockey at the Olympic Games
 Ice Hockey World Championships
 List of IIHF World Championship medalists
 List of Canadian national ice hockey team rosters

References 

Teams for the 1964–1976 Olympic players were found through hockeydb.com

National ice hockey team rosters
United States national ice hockey team